Glen Morris, Ontario may refer to the following places:

Glen Morris, Brant County, Ontario
Glen Morris, Leeds and Grenville United Counties, Ontario